is a Japanese reading aid consisting of smaller kana or syllabic characters printed either above or next to kanji (logographic characters) or other characters to indicate their pronunciation. It is one type of ruby text. In modern Japanese, it is usually used to gloss rare kanji, to clarify rare, nonstandard or ambiguous kanji readings, or in children's or learners' materials. Before the post-World War II script reforms, it was more widespread.

Furigana is most often written in hiragana, though in certain cases it may be written in katakana, Roman alphabet letters or in other, simpler kanji. In vertical text, tategaki, the furigana is placed to the right of the line of text; in horizontal text, yokogaki, it is placed above the line of text, as illustrated below.

or

Appearance
Furigana may be added by character, in which case the furigana character(s) that correspond to a kanji are centered over that kanji; or by word or phrase, in which case the entire furigana text is centered over several kanji characters, even if the kanji do not represent equal shares of the kana needed to write them. The latter method is more common, especially since some words in Japanese have unique pronunciations (jukujikun) that are not related to readings of any of the characters the word is written with.

Furigana fonts are generally sized so that two kana characters fit naturally over one kanji; when more kana are required, this is resolved either by adjusting the furigana by using a condensed font (narrowing the kana), or by adjusting the kanji by intercharacter spacing (adding spaces around the kanji). In case an isolated kanji character has a long reading—for example  (where  reads , tazusa)—the furigana may instead spill over into the space next to the neighboring kana characters, without condensing or changing spacing. Very long readings also occur for certain kanji or symbols which have a gairaigo (loan word) reading; the word "centimeter" is generally written as "cm" (with two half-width characters, so occupying one space) and has the seven-kana reading  (senchimētoru) (it can also be written as the kanji , though this is very rare); another common example is "%" (the percent sign), which has the five kana reading  (pāsento). These cause severe spacing problems due to length and these words being used as units (hence closely associated with the preceding figure).

When it is necessary to distinguish between native Japanese kun'yomi  pronunciations and Chinese-derived on'yomi pronunciations, for example in kanji dictionaries, the kun'yomi pronunciations are written in hiragana, and the on'yomi pronunciations are written in katakana. However, this distinction is really only important in dictionaries and other reference works. In ordinary prose, the script chosen will usually be hiragana. The one general exception to this is modern Chinese place names, personal names, and (occasionally) food names—these will often be written with kanji, and katakana used for the furigana; in more casual writing these are simply written in katakana, as borrowed words. Occasionally this style is also used for loanwords from other languages (especially English). For example, the kanji  (literally "one horn beast") might be glossed with katakana , yunikōn, to show the pronunciation of the loanword "unicorn", which is unrelated to the normal reading of the kanji. Generally, though, such loanwords are just written in straight katakana.

This was especially common in old-fashioned movable type printing when smaller fonts were not available. Nowadays, with computer-based printing systems, this occurs less frequently.

Alignment rules in word processing or typesetting

Various word processing or typesetting software programs, such as Microsoft Word, Adobe InDesign, Adobe InCopy, etc. have features for adding ruby text, especially Japanese furigana. Among formatting features are different rules for aligning the kana over or to the right of the base text, usually either when the base text string is longer than the furigana string or vice versa. Extra spaces may be needed depending on the size of the shorter string (either the ruby string or the base string) relatively to the longer one.
 Centered, left/top or right/bottom: No spaces are added in between the characters. The shorter string is aligned to the center (中付きルビ nakatsuki rubi), the left/top (肩付きルビ katatsuki rubi) or the right/bottom of the longer string.
 1-2-1 (JIS): Spaces are added at the start of and the end of the shorter string, and in between its component characters, so that the spaces in between are twice as wide or tall as the spaces at the start and at the end. Space width or height is calculated based on the width or height of the square bounding box of a glyph (Japanese typefaces are generally monospaced). The strings are still, in essence, aligned to the center of each other, rather than to the left/top or right/bottom.
 0-1-0: Equal spaces are added, similarly to the 1-2-1 rule, in between the component characters of the shorter string, but not its start or end.

Usage

Furigana are most commonly used in works for children, who may not have sufficiently advanced reading skills to recognize the kanji, but can understand the word when written phonetically in hiragana. Because children learn hiragana before katakana, in books for very young children, there are hiragana furigana next to the katakana characters. It is common to use furigana on all kanji characters in works for young children. This is called  in Japanese.

Numeric characters used for counting (e.g.  ni-hon "two long things";  futatsume "second";  dai-ni kan "book 2";  ni-pēji "page 2"; etc.) are usually not tagged with furigana. Exceptions include a few cases such as 一人/１人 hitori "one person" and 二人/２人 futari "two people", which may be tagged with separate kana for each character (/), or non-separated kana for the whole word (/), depending on the style of the publisher in question; or characters for numerals greater than 1,000 (千), such as 万 (10,000), 億 (100,000,000), etc. Numeric words in established compounds (e.g.  ippo "step";  hitome "sight; attention"), however, are generally tagged with furigana.

Many children's, shōnen and shōjo manga use furigana (again however, rarely on numerals). Shōnen and shōjo manga tend to have furigana for all non-numeric characters, while some manga (such as early volumes of Doraemon and other manga published by Shogakukan), may also ignore furigana on elementary-grade kanji or easy words. Seinen and josei manga ignores furigana most of the time, even on the names of the characters if they're common names, although some publishers may still routinely use furigana for the first mentions of important characters' names in a volume or chapter. There are also books with a phonetic guide (mainly in hiragana but sometimes in rōmaji) for Japanese learners, which may be bilingual or Japanese only. These are popular with foreigners wishing to master Japanese faster and enjoy reading Japanese short stories, novels or articles.

Due to the small type used for furigana, for maximum readability, some manga publishers may use regular kana instead of small kana. For example, はっしん hasshin may be spelled はつしん *hatsushin instead.

Some websites and tools exist which provide a phonetic guide for Japanese web pages (in hiragana, rōmaji or kiriru-moji); these are popular with both Japanese children and foreign Japanese learners.

In works aimed at adult Japanese speakers, furigana may be used on a word written in uncommon kanji; in the mass media, they are generally used on words containing non-Jōyō kanji.

Furigana commonly appear alongside kanji names and their romanizations on signs for railway stations, even if the pronunciation of the kanji is commonly known. Furigana also appear often on maps to show the pronunciation of unusual place names.

Before the war, youths might arguably have been almost illiterate if not for furigana.

Names
Japanese names are usually written in kanji. Because there are many possible readings for kanji names, including special name-only readings called nanori, furigana are often used to give the readings of names. On Japanese official forms, where the name is to be written, there is always an adjacent column for the name to be written in furigana.

Furigana may also be used for foreign names written in kanji. Chinese and Korean names are the most common examples: Chinese names are usually pronounced with Japanese readings and the pronunciation written in hiragana, while Korean names are usually pronounced with Korean readings and the pronunciation written in katakana.

Language learning
Kanji and kanji compounds are often presented with furigana in Japanese-language textbooks for non-native speakers.

Furigana are also often used in foreign-language textbooks for Japanese learners to indicate pronunciation. The words are written in the original foreign script, such as hangul for Korean, and furigana is used to indicate the pronunciation. According to Ministry of Education guidelines, and the opinions of educators, the use of Japanese furigana should be avoided in English teaching due to the differences in pronunciation between English and Japanese.

Punning and double meaning
Some writers use furigana to represent slang pronunciations, particularly those that would be difficult to understand without the kanji to provide their meaning.

This means that the actual word used was "that", but the kanji clarify for the reader what "that" refers to. Another way to use it is to tag  onto words or names for places, to convey something along the line of, for example, "here (at this hospital)" or "here (in LA)".

Furigana unrelated to the kanji they are assigned to are quite often used to convey certain effects, rather than to denote a phonetic guide, especially in manga, anime, and games both video and tabletop. This usage is known as gikun (see also Kanji#Special readings). The specific types of effects vary: furigana could be used to visually reinforce complex ideas without having to use long expressions; to annotate strange, foreign, rarely seen text; to use more artistic or more explanatory spellings for regular words (see Kanji#Gikun); or simply for shorthand for base text abbreviation, thanks to the small type of furigana. For example, the word  "nightmare" may be assigned with  shinjitsu "truth" rather than its true reading,  akumu, to convey the meaning of "nightmarish truth". Some authors may even use furigana that means the opposite of what the base text does to reinforce an effect, such as the complicated relationship between characters. For example,  shin'yū "close friend" may be tagged with  raibaru "rival", to mean "you're my rival, but also my friend"; or conversely,  kōtekishu "eternal rival" may be tagged with  tomo "friend". Some manga make use of the furigana renditions of foreign words (especially obscure ones) as the intended reading of a term, and the more familiar kanji for the meaning of such a term. For example,  may be assigned with  burakku majikku, the rendition of the English "black magic", to convey a foreign, exotic feel;  with  sutēshon "station";  with  hanīmūn "honeymoon". This is sometimes done conversely, for example, by using  kissu "kiss", the more familiar term, as furigana to convey meaning, and  bēze "", the exotic term, as base text. For shorthand purposes, abbreviations such as  may be used to make the regular kana spelling that is too long smaller type.

In karaoke it is extremely common for furigana to be placed on the song lyrics. The song lyrics are often written in kanji pronounced quite differently from the furigana. The furigana version is used for pronunciation.

Also, because the kanji represent meaning while the furigana represent sound, one can combine the two to create puns or indicate meanings of foreign words. One might write the kanji for "blue", but use katakana to write the pronunciation of the English word "blue"; this may be done, for example, in Japanese subtitles on foreign films, where it can help associate the written Japanese with the sounds actually being spoken by the actors, or it may be used in a translation of a work of fiction to enable the translator to preserve the original sound of a proper name (such as "Firebolt" in the Harry Potter series) in furigana, while simultaneously indicating its meaning with kanji. A similar practice is used in native fiction to clarify extended meanings. For example, in a work of science fiction, some astronaut could use the word , furusato, meaning "my hometown", when referring to planet Earth. To clarify that for the reader, the word furusato (hometown) might be written in hiragana over the kanji for chikyū (Earth).

Other Japanese reading aids

Okurigana

Okurigana are kana that appear inline at normal size following kanji stems, typically to complete and to inflect adjectives and verbs. In this use they may also help to disambiguate kanji with multiple readings; for example,  (agaru) vs.  (noboru). Unlike furigana, the use of okurigana is a mandatory part of the written language.

Kunten

In the written style known as kanbun, which is the Japanese approximation of Classical Chinese, small marks called kunten are sometimes added as reading aids. Unlike furigana, which indicate pronunciation, kunten indicate Japanese grammatical structures absent from the kanbun, and also show how words should be reordered to fit Japanese sentence structure.

Furikanji
Furigana are sometimes also used to indicate meaning, rather than pronunciation. Over the foreign text, smaller-sized Japanese words, in kana or kanji, corresponding to the meaning of the foreign words, effectively translate it in place. While rare now, some late 19th–early 20th century authors used kanji as furigana for loanwords written in katakana. This usage is called  in Japanese, since furigana implies the use of kana. For example,  ririkku "lyric" may be tagged with  kashi "lyrics" for clarification rather than for phonetic guidance.

See also
Okurigana
Ruby character
Zhuyin

Notes

References

Citations

Sources 

 Mangajin's Basic Japanese Through Comics [Part I] New York: Weatherhill, 1998: 48–49
 J Paul Warnick, Review of Nihon o Hanasoo in The Journal of the Association of Teachers of Japanese, Vol. 32, No. 2 (Oct., 1998), pp. 80–83.

External links
 Add Ruby automatically for Japanese Web site—Multi-language phonetic reading site that can add phonetic reading to any site or texts in five different alphabets, hiragana, katakana, Roman, hangul, Devanagari, and Cyrillic letters for Japanese.

Japanese writing system terms
Kana
Ruby characters
Japanese writing system
East Asian typography